Cesare Biseo (April 18, 1843 – January 25, 1909) was an Italian painter, known primarily for his orientalist scenes.

Biography
He was born to Giovanni Battista Biseo (1815-1865), a decorative and restorative painter from Brescia. He received his training from his father, and initially performed decorative work as well.

In 1870 or 1871, he was invited by Isma'il Pasha, the Khedive of Egypt, to decorate his palace and other public buildings in Alexandria with frescoes. He also worked in Cairo. This trip gave him subjects for many of his future works. He returned to North Africa, in the company of Stefano Ussi and Edmondo De Amicis, as part of the first Italian embassy to Morocco.

His first exhibit was in 1877, in Naples. At the Esposizione di Belle Arti of Rome, in 1883, he exhibited a large canvas portraying the reception of the first ambassadors to Morocco. Three years later, he was part of the group that met the first Muslim delegation at the Quirinale. At the 1887 Mostra di Venezia, he exhibited a series of watercolors titled Ricordi de Cairo (Memories of Cairo). He was a member of the progressive artists' association, "".

Selected paintings and illustrations

See also
 List of Orientalist artists
 Orientalism

References

External links

 More works by Biseo @ ArtNet

1843 births
1909 deaths
Painters from Rome
19th-century Italian painters
Italian male painters
20th-century Italian painters
Orientalist painters
19th-century Italian male artists
20th-century Italian male artists